Tebu Community is an indigenous Itsekiri rural community in Warri Kingdom. Tebu Community was founded by Ifie and Eyengho who are the children of Uwankun and Otete. It is located along the creek of Olero, Benin River in Warri North Local Government Area of present-day Delta State, Nigeria.

It sits in the Tebu ward of Warri North and Warri federal constituency.

Geography
Tebu Community is located at latitude 5.846017 and longitude 5.110471. Tebu community is 11 meters/36.09 feet above sea level. Her border communities include Jakpa, Gbokoda, Deleoketa, Aja-metan and Udo.

References

See also
Warri

 

Communities of Warri Kingdom

Populated coastal places in Nigeria